Suk Jin-wook (Hangul: 석진욱; born December 5, 1976) is a retired volleyball player from South Korea, who played as an outside hitter for the South Korean men's national team. He was named Best Receiver at the 2008 Olympic Qualification Tournament, where South Korea ended up in third place and missed qualification for the 2008 Summer Olympics in Beijing, PR China. Although he was technically an outside hitter, Suk showed exceptional defensive skills in playing with a libero player in the back row - as an outside hitter he was often named Best Receiver in domestic and international competitions.

Suk is currently the assistant coach with the Ansan OK Savings Bank in V-League.

Honours
2002 Asian Games — Gold Medal
2003 FIVB World Cup — 6th place
2003 Asian Volleyball Championship — Gold Medal, Best Receiver
2008 Olympic Qualification Tournament — Best Receiver
2010 Asian Games — Bronze Medal

References
 FIVB biography

1976 births
Living people
South Korean men's volleyball players
Place of birth missing (living people)
Asian Games medalists in volleyball
Volleyball players at the 2002 Asian Games
Volleyball players at the 2010 Asian Games
Daejeon Samsung Bluefangs players
Asian Games gold medalists for South Korea
Asian Games bronze medalists for South Korea
Sportspeople from Incheon
Medalists at the 2002 Asian Games
Medalists at the 2010 Asian Games
21st-century South Korean people